Adam Stephen House is a historic home located at Martinsburg, Berkeley County, West Virginia. It was built between 1772 and 1789, and is a -story, stone house measuring 43 feet, 5 inches, by 36 feet, 3 inches.  It was the home of Adam Stephen (c. 1718 – July 16, 1791). Built of shaped limestone, it stands on a prominent stone ledge, with two outbuildings in stone and log. After falling into near-ruin, iIt was restored in the 1960s by the General Adam Stephen Memorial Association and is open as a historic house museum. The house was built over a natural cave, with stone steps leading down from the basement. A local caver's organization has worked since 2002 to excavate the cave, which had become plugged with earth, and the excavation is available for tours on open house days.

The site also includes the Triple Brick House, a brick two-story building built into the embankment next to the railroad tracks that run close to the site. It was built about 1875, and was primarily for residential use, but may also have been a kitchen for dining cars on the B&O railroad line.

It was listed on the National Register of Historic Places in 1970.  It is located within the South Water Street Historic District, listed in 1980.

References

External links
Washington Heritage Trail website
General Adam Stephen Memorial Association website

Buildings and structures in Martinsburg, West Virginia
Historic house museums in West Virginia
Houses completed in 1772
Houses in Berkeley County, West Virginia
Houses on the National Register of Historic Places in West Virginia
Museums in Berkeley County, West Virginia
National Register of Historic Places in Martinsburg, West Virginia
Stone houses in West Virginia
1772 establishments in Virginia